Soham railway station is a station on the Ipswich–Ely line, serving the town of Soham in Cambridgeshire. The original station operated between 1879 and 1965. It was reopened in 2021.

History
Soham station originally opened on 1 September 1879.

On 2 June 1944, the station was destroyed in the Soham rail disaster, when a munitions train carrying high explosive bombs caught fire and blew up, killing two and damaging over seven hundred buildings. The driver, Benjamin Gimbert, and fireman, James Nightall, were both awarded the George Cross for preventing further damage which would have occurred if the rest of the train had exploded. The signal box, also damaged in the explosion which resulted in the death of signalman Frank Bridges, is now preserved on the Mid-Norfolk Railway.

The station was closed to passengers on 13 September 1965, but the line remained open both as a passenger route and for a heavy service of freight trains running principally between Felixstowe Docks and the Midlands.

Following many years of local campaigning, a new station was opened, on the same site, on 13 December 2021, with services operated by Greater Anglia.

Reopening 

Since closure a local campaign had run to reopen the station. In February 2011 East Cambridgeshire District Council obtained funding for a study into a possible reopening.
In January 2013 Network Rail released a five-year upgrade plan, which included reopening Soham station as part of improvements to the Ipswich to Ely Line.

A Network Rail study concluded that building a new station on the existing infrastructure was feasible and that the current line could support an additional stop at Soham. Although Soham was unsuccessful in a bid submitted to the New Stations Fund second round, funding was obtained from the Cambridgeshire and Peterborough Combined Authority (CPCA) and Cambridgeshire County Council to progress the next stage of design work with Network Rail.

Enabling works for the new station by Network Rail started in autumn 2020, and main construction started in March 2021. The station was opened in December 2021.

There are no current plans for direct services to Cambridge, but the CPCA has expressed support for the idea in a future phase of the project. Mayor James Palmer said "the delivery of Soham station gives us a much stronger case to go to Government and Network Rail and lobby for the reinstating of the Snailwell loop which will provide a direct service between Ely, Soham, Newmarket and Cambridge".

Facilities
The station has a single  platform capable of accommodating a four-car train. A stepped footbridge spans across the railway to an existing right of way – as well as being future proofed for a potential second platform and lifts. The station also has a drop off and pick up point, cycle parking and a 50 space car park.

Services

All services are operated by Greater Anglia using  bi-mode trains.

References

External links

Soham On-Line
 Station on 1947 OS Map

Railway stations in Cambridgeshire
Former Great Eastern Railway stations
Railway stations in Great Britain opened in 1879
Railway stations in Great Britain closed in 1965
Railway stations in Great Britain opened in 2021
Railway stations opened by Network Rail
Reopened railway stations in Great Britain
1879 establishments in England
1965 disestablishments in England
Soham
Greater Anglia franchise railway stations